The Minister of the Interior was a cabinet minister within the Swedish government and appointed by the Prime Minister of Sweden. From 1947 to 1974 and from 1996 to 1998, the minister headed the Ministry of the Interior.

It was reintroduced as a minister without portfolio post under name of Minister for Home Affairs in 2014. Its tasks includes issues regarding the Swedish Police Authority and combating terrorism.

List of officeholders

Footnotes

References

Government ministers of Sweden